Marylebone East was a borough constituency located in the Metropolitan Borough of St Marylebone, in London.  It returned one Member of Parliament (MP)  to the House of Commons of the Parliament of the United Kingdom, elected by the first past the post voting system.

The constituency was created under the Redistribution of Seats Act 1885, and was formerly part of the two-seat Marylebone constituency. It was abolished for the 1918 general election.

Boundaries
The wards of Cavendish Square, Dorset Square and Regent's Park, Portland Place, and St John's Wood Terrace.

Members of Parliament

Elections

Elections in the 1880s 

Beresford was appointed Lord Commissioner of the Admiralty, requiring a by-election.

Beresford resigned, causing a by-election.

Elections in the 1890s

Elections in the 1900s

Elections in the 1910s

References 

Parliamentary constituencies in London (historic)
Constituencies of the Parliament of the United Kingdom established in 1885
Constituencies of the Parliament of the United Kingdom disestablished in 1918
Politics of the City of Westminster